Arina Rodionova was the defending champion, having won the event in 2012, but lost in the semifinals to Noppawan Lertcheewakarn.

Casey Dellacqua won the tournament, defeating Lertcheewakarn in the final, 6–4, 6–4.

Seeds

Main draw

Finals

Top half

Bottom half

References 
 Main draw

Bendigo Women's International 1 - Singles